Phaet is a tambon (sub-district) of Kham Ta Kla District, in Sakon Nakhon Province, northeast Thailand.

References

Populated places in Sakon Nakhon province